Birjand County is in South Khorasan province, Iran. The capital of the county is the city of Birjand. At the 2006 census, the county's population was 221,756 in 60,240 households. The following census in 2011 counted 259,506 people in 71,384 households. At the 2016 census, the county's population was 261,324 in 74,657 households, by which time Khusf District had been separated from the county to form Khusf County.

Administrative divisions

The population history and structural changes of Birjand County's administrative divisions over three consecutive censuses are shown in the following table. The latest census shows one district, six rural districts, and one city.

References

 

Counties of South Khorasan Province